Catarina Isabel Silva Amado (born 21 July 1999) is a Portuguese footballer who plays as a forward for Benfica in the Campeonato Nacional Feminino.

Honours 
Benfica
 Campeonato Nacional Feminino: 2020–21, 2021–22
 Taça da Liga: 2019–20, 2020–21
 Supertaça de Portugal: 2019, 2022

References 

1999 births
Living people
Portuguese women's footballers
Women's association football forwards
S.L. Benfica (women) footballers
Campeonato Nacional de Futebol Feminino players
Sportspeople from Coimbra
People from Lousã
Portugal women's international footballers
UEFA Women's Euro 2022 players